Richard Condie (born 1965) is the Anglican Bishop of Tasmania. He was installed as bishop on 19 March 2016. Condie was previously vicar of St Jude's Church, Carlton, and an archdeacon in the Diocese of Melbourne. He is the leader of the Fellowship of Confessing Anglicans in Australia.

Condie has also been a lecturer in New Testament at Ridley Theological College and a research officer with the Queensland Police Service.

In 2022, Condie declared that he would not be celebrating Australia Day as a holiday.

References

1965 births
Living people
Anglican archdeacons in Australia
Anglican bishops of Tasmania
21st-century Anglican bishops in Australia
Evangelical Anglican bishops
Anglican realignment people